Oliver Leaman (born 1950) is a professor of philosophy and Zantker Professor of Judaic studies at the University of Kentucky, where he has been teaching since 2000. He studies the history of Islamic, Jewish and Eastern philosophy. He received his PhD from the University of Cambridge in 1979.

Books
 An introduction to medieval Islamic philosophy, Cambridge University Press, 1985.
 Death and loss: Compassionate Attitudes in the Classroom, Cassell, 1995.
 Evil and suffering in Jewish philosophy, Cambridge University Press, 1995
 History of Islamic Philosophy, ed. S. H. Nasr & O. Leaman, Routledge, 1996
 Friendship East and West – Philosophical Perspectives, ed. O. Leaman, Curzon, 1996.
 History of Jewish Philosophy, ed. D. Frank & O. Leaman, Routledge, 1996.
 Moses Maimonides Curzon, 1997, 2nd Edition ("The Assault on the kalam" reprinted in Classical and Medieval Literature Criticism, vo. 76, ed. J. Krstovic, Gale Group
 Averroes and his Philosophy Curzon, 1997, 2nd Edition
 The Future of Philosophy: towards the 21st Century, ed. O. Leaman (Routledge, 1998).
 Key Concepts in Eastern Philosophy, Routledge, 1999.
 A Brief Introduction to Islamic Philosophy, Polity Press, 1999.
 Eastern Philosophy: Key Readings, London, Routledge, 2000.
 A Reader in Jewish Philosophy, ed. D. Frank, O. Leaman & C. Manekin, Routledge, 2000
 Encyclopedia of Asian Philosophy, ed. O. Leaman, Routledge, 2001
 Companion Encyclopedia of Middle Eastern and North African Film, ed. O. Leaman, Routledge, 2001
 Encyclopedia of Death and Dying, ed. G. Howarth & O. Leaman, Routledge,2001
 Introduction to Classical Islamic Philosophy, Cambridge University Press, 2001
 Cambridge Companion to Medieval Jewish Philosophy, ed. D. Frank & O. Leaman, Cambridge University Press ['Introduction'] 2003.
 Lost in Translation: Essays in Islamic and Jewish Philosophy, Sarajevo: buybook, 2004
 Islamic Aesthetics: An Introduction, Edinburgh University Press, Islamic Surveys Series, 2004.
 The Qur'an: An Encyclopedia, ed. O. Leaman, Routledge, 2006
 Islamic Philosophy A-Z, with Peter Groff, Edinburgh University Press, 2007
 Controversies in Contemporary Islam, Routledge, 2013
 The Biographical Encyclopedia of Islamic Philosophy, ed. O. Leaman, Bloomsbury, 2015
 The Qur'an: A Philosophical Guide, Bloomsbury, 2016
 Islam and Morality: A Philosophical Introduction, Bloomsbury, 2019 
 Routledge Handbook of Islamic Ritual and Practice, editor, Routledge, 2022

References

External links

 Home page

Living people
Judaic scholars
20th-century American Jews
Jewish philosophers
Philosophers from Kentucky
University of Kentucky faculty
Alumni of the University of Cambridge
1950 births
21st-century American Jews